Khamak is a distinguished embroidery artwork from Kandahar. Embroidery is the usual practice for household textiles by women artisans in Afghanistan. Khamak consists of very complicated designs than other techniques (Such as Gul dozee which is an easier stitch pattern embroidery). They use delicate silk satin stitches on fine woven cloths of cotton or wool fabrics.

Name 
Khamak is also called Khamak dooze or Kandahari means ‘Kandahar’s work,’ Khamak is a word of  Pashto language.

Artwork 
For women in Kandahar the embroidery is a natural skill. It is their traditional activity besides weaving and sewing.

Use 
The Kandahari ( Khamak) is mainly used for decorating pashtun clothing, many linens such as pillow covers and tablecloths and scarves and shawls.

See also
 Pashtun clothing

References 

Embroidery
Embroidery by country
Afghan clothing
Pashtun culture
Kandahar